Vinveli Payana Kurippugal (Tamil: விண்வெளி பயணக் குறிப்புகள்; English: space trip notes) is a 2017 science fiction film written, co-produced and directed by R. Jayaprakash and produced by Yazh Mozhi R. Babu Sankar under the company Lemurian Thirakkalam. The film played as an official selection in 28 different international film festivals, ultimately winning 12 different awards, including Cult Critic Awards. The film premiered in theaters on July 20, 2018.

Plot

Cast
Athvik Jalandhar
Pooja Ramakrishnan
Jogikumar
Gopalakrishnan
Muthirulan
Se Thamizh

Production
The first shooting schedule was started in the forest area of Telangana state and the second schedule was done in Aruppukottai and Madurai and its nearby area in 2016–17.

Ganesh Raghavendra of Renigunta fame composed  the music.

References

2017 films
2010s Tamil-language films
Space adventure films
Indian science fiction films
Space opera films
2017 directorial debut films